Brigadier General Eric Edward Mockler-Ferryman  (1896–1978) was a British army military intelligence officer who wrote the British official history of the Second World War between 1947 and 1952.  During the Second World War, Ferryman headed up the German section of the Directorate of Military Intelligence (DMI), he was General Eisenhower's chief of intelligence in the run-up to Operation Torch, and he ended the war with a transfer to the civilian Special Operations Executive (SOE). He was awarded the Legion of Merit.

References

Primary sources
Ball, Gassert, Gestrich & Neitzel, "Cultures of Intelligence in the Era of the World Wars", New York: Oxford, 2020

External links
 Date of Rank: Link

1896 births
1978 deaths
20th-century British military personnel
British Army brigadiers
British Army personnel of World War II
Commanders of the Order of the British Empire
Foreign recipients of the Legion of Merit
Special Operations Executive personnel